Pakistan is home to many archaeological sites dating from Lower Paleolithic period to Mughal empire. The earliest known archaeological findings belong to the Soanian culture from the Soan Valley, near modern-day Islamabad. Soan Valley culture is considered as the best known Palaeolithic culture of Central Asia.
Mehrgarh in Balochistan is one of the most important Neolithic sites dating from 7000 BCE to 2000 BCE. The Mehrgarh culture was amongst the first culture in the world to establish agriculture and livestock and live in villages. Mehrgarh civilization lasted for 5000 years till 2000 BCE after which people migrated to other areas, possibly Harappa and Mohenjo-daro. Harappa and Mohenjo-daro are the best known sites from the Indus Valley civilization (c 2500 - 1900 BCE).

Stone Age

Lower Paleolithic (Pre-Soanian)

Pre-Soanian culture in Pakistan corresponds to Oldowan culture dating back to the Mindel glaciation. Some findings in Punjab belong to this period.

Lower to Middle Paleolithic (Soanian)
Early Soanian sites correspond to the Acheulean period. Different stone artifacts have been discovered from these sites from all over Pakistan. Sites in Soan Valley and Potohar Plateau from this period include;
 Adiala
 Chauntra
 Ghariala
Riwat 
 Balawal
 Chak Sighu
 Chakri
 Rawalpindi
 Morgah
 Dina
 Jalalpur Sharif

Neolithic
Mehrgarh (c. 7000 BCE - 2000 BCE), from Neolithic age, in Balochistan is one of the earliest sites with evidence of agriculture and village structure.

Ghaggar-Hakra (c. 6000 BCE) Artifacts Found in Hakra Civilization also date back to the same period of Mehrgarh.

Pre Harappa
Pre-Harappan farming communities date back to Neolithic time which ultimately evolved into urban Harappan civilization. Explorations and archaeological findings establish the dateline of Pre-Harappan culture from 2700 BC to 2100 BC followed by Harappan period from 2100 BC onwards. Some of the regions showing pre-Harappan culture include;
 Pirak where the culture later advanced into Indus  Valley Civilization.
 Bolan
 Kachi
 Sheri Khan Tarakai is a neolithic village and second oldest farming settlement in South Asia.
 Lewan
 Akra
 Kili Gul Muhammad
 Amri-Nal
 Kulli
 Kot Diji

Bronze Age

Early Harappan
Harrappa
 Rehman Dheri - 4000 BCE
 Amri - 3600 to 3300 BCE
 Nausharo
 Rana Ghundai
 Sur Jangal

Indus Valley civilization
 Mohenjo-daro in Sindh
 Dabar Kot
 Periano Ghundai
 Chanhudaro in Sindh
 Lakhueen-jo-daro
 Sutkagan Dor

Iron Age

 Takht-i-Bahi in Khyber Pakhtunkhwa
 Seri Bahlol in Khyber Pakhtunkhwa
 Akra in Khyber Pakhtunkhwa
 Taxila in Punjab
 Mankiala in Punjab
 Thatta in Sindh
 Mehluha in Sindh

Middle age

Classical age
Gandhara and its capital Pushkalavati
Pattala

Late medieval age
Sagala

Islamic era
Islamic influence in the region started as early as 7th Century.
Ali Masjid
Jamia Mosque (Khudabad)
Mansura, Sindh
Debal

See also 
List of World Heritage Sites in Pakistan
Hindu and Buddhist architectural heritage of Pakistan
List of monuments in Pakistan
Tourism in Pakistan

References 

 
Lists of tourist attractions in Pakistan
Lists of places in Pakistan